Shagali may refer to:
Ankadzor, Armenia
Vahagni, Armenia
Vahagnadzor, Armenia